Crassispira promensis is an extinct species of sea snail, a marine gastropod mollusk in the family Pseudomelatomidae, the turrids and allies.

Description
The length of the shell attains 29.5 mm, its diameter 9.5 mm.

Distribution
Fossils have been found in  Miocene strata in Myanmar, age range: 23.03 to 20.43 Ma

References

 Noetling, Fritz. "Fauna of the Miocene beds of Burma." Memoirs of the Geological Survey of India, Palaeontologica Indica, New Series 1 (1901): 25-pls.
 E. Vredenburg. 1921. Results of a revision of some portions of Dr Noetling's second monograph on the Tertiary fauna of Burma. Records of the Geological Survey of India 51:224-302

External links
 Worldwide Mollusc Species Data Base: Crassispira promensis

promensis
Gastropods described in 1901